Agononida aequabilis is a species of squat lobster in the family Munididae. The species name is derived from the Latin aequabilis, meaning "equal", or "similar", in reference to its similarity to Agononida pilosimanus.

References

Squat lobsters
Crustaceans described in 2006